Yarrowford is a village on the A708, in the Scottish Borders area of Scotland, 4 miles north-west of Selkirk, in the Ettrick Forest.

The Yarrow Water flows through the village and joins the Ettrick Water near Philiphaugh.

Places nearby include Bowhill, Ettrickbridge, Newark Castle, the Yair Forest, Yarrow, Scottish Borders and Yarrow Feus.

See also
List of places in the Scottish Borders
List of places in Scotland

External links

RCAHMS record of Yarrowford, Yarrow Water, Bridge
Scotland's Places: Populated Place, Yarrow Ford
Scottish Borders Council: Finalised Local Plan
Geograph image: Yarrowford Public Hall
VisitScotland: The Three Brethren, Yarrowford

Villages in the Scottish Borders